Regeneration may refer to:

Science and technology
 Regeneration (biology), the ability to recreate lost or damaged cells, tissues, organs and limbs
 Regeneration (ecology), the ability of ecosystems to regenerate biomass, using photosynthesis
 Regeneration in humans, the ability of humans to recreate, or induce the regeneration of, lost tissue
 Regenerative (design), a process for resilient and sustainable development
 Regenerative agriculture, a sub-category of organic agriculture

History and politics
Regeneration (Colombia), La Regeneración, a 19th-century period and political movement in Colombia
Regeneration (Portugal), a 19th-century period in the history of Portugal
 The ReGeneration, a cultural generation concerned with environmentalism
 Viðreisn (Regeneration), a political party in Iceland founded in 2016

Music
 Regeneration (Stanley Cowell album) (1976)
 Regeneration (Roy Orbison album) (1977)
 Regeneration (The Divine Comedy album) (2001)
 Regeneration (Superchick album) (2003)

Film and television
 Regeneration (1915 film), a film starring John McCann
 Regeneration (1923 film), a Norman Studios production
 Regeneration (1997 film) or Behind the Lines, a film adapted from the Pat Barker novel
 ReGeneration (2010 film), a documentary film
 "Regeneration" (K-9), an episode of K-9
 "Re-generation" (The Outer Limits), a 1997 episode of The Outer Limits
 "Regeneration" (Star Trek: Enterprise), an episode of Star Trek: Enterprise
 "Regeneration", an episode of Transformers: Prime
 Regeneration (Doctor Who), a biological ability exhibited by the Time Lords in the fictional context of Doctor Who

Literature
 Regeneration (Haggard book), a 1910 non-fiction work by H. Rider Haggard
 Regeneration (novel), a novel by Pat Barker
 Regeneration, a book by Thomas Hunt Morgan

Other uses
 Regeneration (sculpture), a 1975 sculpture by Alan Collins
 Regeneration (theology), the doctrine of being born again
 Evil Dead: Regeneration, a 2005 video game for the PlayStation 2 and Xbox

See also
 Bush regeneration, an ecological technique practiced in Australia
 DPF regeneration, removing soot from a diesel particulate filter
 Hydrochloric acid regeneration, a chemical process for the reclamation of HCl from metal chloride solutions as hydrochloric acid
 Presumptive regeneration, the idea that the children of Christians will be born again because God cares for and chooses families as well as individuals
 Regenerative amplification, a process used to generate short but strong pulses of laser light
 Regenerative brake, an apparatus or system which allows a vehicle to recapture energy normally lost to heat when braking
 Regeneration buffer (or regen buffer for short), a kind of video memory buffer in computer video hardware
 Regenerative capacitor memory, a type of computer memory used in the Atanasoff–Berry computer
 Regenerative circuit, a circuit in electronics that allows a signal to be amplified many times
 Regenerative cooling (rocket), a process in rocket engines
 Regenerative medicine, Clinical therapy to replace or regenerate human cells, tissue or organs, to restore or establish normal function
 Regenerative process, a class of stochastic processes in applied probability
 Urban regeneration, or urban renewal
 Regeneración, Mexican newspaper